Pidiyum Kozhiyum is a traditional food item of St. Thomas Nasrani Christians (Syro Malabar) in Keralam. It is a kind of dish which can be both used in Breakfast or Dinner. Term 'Pidi' stands for a whitish semi-liquid dish with small boiled balls of finely powdered rice. Term 'Kozhi' in 'Pidiyum Kozhiyum' stands for chicken curry, which is prepared with traditional ingredients. This dish is often considered as a healthy food item due to its richness in fibers, proteins and carbohydrates.

Origin 
Its origin dates back to early times, when the Syrian Christians started to evolve in Kerala under the leadership of St. Thomas in AD 50. 'Pidiyum Kozhiyum' in those days were an expensive dish that was exclusively prepared in the houses of upper-class people. That was because its ingredients were too expensive. This dish is influenced by the dish 'Kozhikkotta' or 'Panchara Unda' or 'Chakkara Unda'.

Religious importance

'Pidiyum Kozhiyum is blessed and served as a part of a religious ceremony, 'Panthrandu Sleehanmaarude Nercha' or the ' to Twelve Apostles', a traditional ceremony related to Syrian Jacobite Christians and Syro Malabar Christians  in which blessed food is served to twelve boy children under the age of 15.  Those twelve boy children denotes the twelve apostles of Jesus Christ. Piravom (A Christian traditional town in eranakulam Kottayam districts border) is very famous for this dish and this nercha.

Present status 

During the early years of independence, Christian community in Kerala underwent a lot of changes; both social and cultural. Christians here were largely influenced by the West in their way of dressing, language, food, marriage ceremonies etc. Many of the traditional values that were passed by the older generations were lost or neglected. 'Pidiyum Kozhiyum' was not an exception. It lost its elegance and become rarely served in Christian Functions. But later, as a part of cultural renovation, it is made in the families for many functions like marriages, religious ceremonies, festivals etc.

References

Kerala cuisine